Erich Lüth (born 1 February 1902 in Hamburg, died 1 April 1989) was a German writer and film director.

Career
Lüth began his career in 1923 as an intern in the editorial staff of the Hamburger Ullstein Verlag Berlin his education. Subsequently, he was editor of the Hamburger Anzeiger and chairman of the Hamburg Young Democrats. In 1928 he was the DDP member of the Hamburg Parliament. In addition, Lüth was a member of the German Peace Society and was active in his party's pacifist wing and fell within the Young Democrats and the DDP on the basis of a call for military service in 1929. In spring 1930 Lüth left the DDP and in the same year joined the inaugural Radical Democratic Party (RDP). From 1933 to 1935 Lüth managed a trade association.

In 1943, Lüth was drafted as a soldier and was captured, becoming a prisoner of war in Italy.  During his imprisonment, he was editor of the POW camp newspaper, "Lagerpost von Ghedi" until his release in 1946. He joined the SPD and became Director of the National Press Office in Hamburg until 1953 and then again from 1957 until his retirement in 1964.

From 1953 to 1957, Lüth was head of the Press Division of the German Theatre Association. He was founder and chairman of the Press club in Hamburg, and co-founded the " Society of Friends of Franco-German intellectual relations "and also the initiator of the Peace with Israel, which merged with the Society for Christian-Jewish Cooperation in autumn 1952.

Luth is the author of numerous books on Israel and participated in peace talks between Germany and Israel in Jerusalem, Haifa and Tel Aviv. In 1984 he was awarded the Mayor Stolten Medal by the Hamburg Senate.

Veit Harlan
His name is known today mainly in connection with a legal case from 1950, whose background Lüth's boycott against the film Immortal Beloved, based on the novel Aquis submersus by Theodor Storm. In 1951, Veit Harlan sued for an injunction against Lüth for publicly calling for a boycott of Unsterbliche Geliebte(Immortal Beloved). The District Court in Hamburg granted Harlan's suit and ordered that Lüth forbear from making such public appeals.  However, the lower court decision was ultimately overturned in 1958 by the Federal Constitutional Court because it infringed on Lüth's right to freedom of expression. This was a landmark decision because it clarified the importance of the constitutional civil rights in disputes between individuals.

References

1902 births
1989 deaths
Writers from Hamburg
German Democratic Party politicians
Radical Democratic Party (Germany) politicians
Social Democratic Party of Germany politicians
German Peace Society members